Alad'2 is a 2018 French comedy film directed by  and produced by 74 Films, Pathé, and M6 Films. It stars Kev Adams, Jamel Debbouze, Vanessa Guide, Éric Judor, and Ramzy Bedia. It is a sequel to the 2015 film The New Adventures of Aladdin.

Plot 
Prince Aladdin (Kev Adams) is bored at the palace. His old life as an adventurer is missing and he does not feel legitimate in his luxurious clothes of a monarch. Shah Zaman (Jamel Debbouze), a ruthless dictator who decided to marry the Princess Shallia, seizes Baghdad and the palace. Aladdin is forced to flee and recover his former genie. This is his only chance to save his princess and deliver Baghdad. Taking advantage of the absence of his rival, Shah Zaman will try everything to crack the princess; from intimidation to seduction, he will stop at nothing to become her husband. After a long journey full of pitfalls, Aladdin is finally back in Baghdad where he will have to face armed guards, the men of Richelieu, a bad genie in the pay of Shah Zaman, and Shah Zaman himself. He will above all have to fight an obstacle which he did not expect: the doubts of the princess.

Cast 
 Kev Adams as Aladdin / Sam
 Jamel Debbouze as Shah Zaman / Yanis  
 Ramzy Bedia as Balouad
  as Princess Shallia / Sofia
 Éric Judor as Le génie d'Aladin
 Noémie Lenoir as a transformation of Shah Zaman's genius 
 Nader Boussandel as the guard of the princess
 Wahid Bouzidi as Wahid
 Michaël Cohen as the shrink
 Booder as Aladdin turned into a soldier of Shah Zaman
 Dimitri Tordjman as the boy on the plane
 Jean-Paul Rouve as the vizier (cameo)
 Isabelle Nanty as the telephone operator (cameo)
 Frédéric Lopez as himself (cameo)
 Gérard Depardieu as Christopher Columbus (cameo)
 Florian Ordonez as a black market merchant (cameo)
 Olivio Ordonez as a black market merchant (cameo)
 Anaïs Delva as Elsa (cameo)
 Tal as herself (cameo)

References

External links 
 
 Alad'2 at Allociné
 Centre national du cinéma et de l'image animée

2018 films
2018 comedy films
French sequel films
French fantasy comedy films
Films directed by Lionel Steketee
2010s French films